James Alonzo Pinney (September 29, 1835 – February 4, 1914) served as mayor of Boise, Idaho Territory (later Boise, Idaho) in the late 19th century and early 20th century. He is the only person in the city's history to serve as mayor three nonconsecutive times and win election as mayor five times.

Pinney was Boise mayor when Idaho Territory became the U.S. state of Idaho in July 1890.

Pinney was passionate about the arts. In his lifetime he owned a bookstore and two theaters. His first theater, The Columbia Theater, was founded in 1882. When The Columbia was torn down in 1908, Pinney replaced it with a five-story theater dubbed The Pinney Theater.

References
Mayors of Boise - Past and Present
Idaho State Historical Society Reference Series, Corrected List of Mayors, 1867-1996
Father of Modern Boise: James Alonzo Pinney

1835 births
1914 deaths
Mayors of Boise, Idaho
19th-century American politicians